Gold Country is the second studio album by Chuck Ragan, which was recorded in 2009 at Flying Whale Studios in Grass Valley, California. This is the first album fully produced by Chuck Ragan.

Track listing

References

External links
Chuck Ragan
Chuck Ragan at SideOneDummy Records

Chuck Ragan albums
2009 albums
SideOneDummy Records albums